Salman Khan Ustajlu was a Turkoman military leader from the Ustajlu tribe, who became a powerful and rich figure during his service in Safavid Iran. He briefly served as the grand vizier of the Safavid king (shah) Abbas I (r. 1588–1629) from 1621 until his death in 1623/4. He was succeeded by Khalifeh Sultan.

Sources
 
 
 

Safavid generals
Iranian Turkmen people
Grand viziers of the Safavid Empire
Safavid governors in Gilan
16th-century births
1624 deaths
Ustajlu
17th-century people of Safavid Iran
Divan-beigi